The Fundy Geological Museum is a geological museum in Parrsboro, Nova Scotia, Canada. It first opened in 1993.  It has received over 300,000 visitors since it opened, averaging more than 21,000 per year. The museum is part of the Nova Scotia Museum system.

Exhibits 
Its exhibits contain fossils of the prosauropod dinosaur, Plateosaurus engelhardti.  It also contains exhibits on local minerals, as well as an explanation of the Bay of Fundy tides.

Other resources 
The museum also has a gift shop and a laboratory where researchers are currently uncovering the skeleton of a 200-million-year-old Prosauropod dinosaur.  It also hosts Nova Scotia's Gem and Mineral Show every year. The Gem and Mineral Show has been held annually for more than 40 years.

Opening hours 
From June 1 to October 15, the museum is open from 9:30 a.m. to 5:30 p.m. daily. For the rest of the year it operates on reduced winter hours.

External links 
 Official museum homepage

References

Museums in Cumberland County, Nova Scotia
Geology museums in Canada
Geology of Nova Scotia
Natural history museums in Canada
Nova Scotia Museum